Teresa "Teri" Austin (born April 17, 1957) is a Canadian animal activist and former actress. She had her greatest acting success in the 1980s and 1990s, and is best known for her role as Jill Bennett in the CBS primetime soap opera Knots Landing, and as co-host of the Canadian reality series Thrill of a Lifetime.

Early life 
Austin was born and raised in Toronto, Canada. She graduated from York University in Toronto.

Career 
Austin began her acting career in Canada where she worked in television, film radio and theatre and co-hosted the show Thrill of a Lifetime before moving to Los Angeles to pursue an acting career there.

Austin is best known for her performance as Jill Bennett on CBS series Knots Landing. She played the role from 1985 to 1989, and in 1990 won Soap Opera Digest Award for Outstanding Villain: Prime Time. She also appeared in Quantum Leap, Seinfeld, Matlock, Murder, She Wrote, L.A. Law, and returned to soap roles in Beverly Hills, 90210 and Models Inc.. In film, she appeared in The Vindicator (1986) and Raising Cain (1992).

In 2001, Austin left acting and began working as animal activist in Los Angeles, creating The Amanda Foundation.

Filmography

References

External links 
 

1957 births
Actresses from Toronto
Canadian film actresses
Canadian television actresses
Living people
York University alumni